Carex miyabei is a tussock-forming species of perennial sedge in the family Cyperaceae. It is native to south eastern parts of China, Japan and the Kuril Islands.

See also
List of Carex species

References

miyabei
Taxa named by Adrien René Franchet
Plants described in 1895
Flora of Japan
Flora of China
Flora of the Kuril Islands